Mamba fruit chews are a brand of fruit chew candies, produced by August Storck KG. They are available in the following flavors: strawberry, orange, lemon, raspberry and cherry. Mamba also does not contain nuts, but there is a risk of cross-contamination in the factory. Mamba was launched in the German market in 1953 and in the US in 1986. They are sold in packages of 6, 18, or 24 soft chews and the flavors within each package are selected at random.

Mamba Sour Fruit Chews were first released in 2007.

Mamba Cola & Friends are a mix of cola and fruit flavors (lemon, cherry, pineapple, orange) sold in the German market.

Mamba Tropics was released March 2017 featuring the flavors Peach-Passionfruit, Pineapple-Coconut, Mango-Orange, and Apple-Kiwi.

References

Products introduced in 1953
August Storck brands
Brand name confectionery
German confectionery
Candy